The Nachrichenregiment 14 (NR-14) „Harro Schulze-Boysen“ was a signal regiment-sized unit of the National People's Army (NVA) Air Forces of the National People's Army of the former East Germany (GDR). The primary task of that unit consisted in the signal support to the Air Force Command (Kdo LSK/LV) as well as of the Main Operation Centre (MOC), the so-called ZGS LSK/LV.

In German, the word Nachrichtenregiment can be ambiguous, and imply an intelligence/signal intelligence purpose. However, this regiment was unequivocally primarily a signal unit.

History 
NR-14 was established in 1956 as a battalion-sized signal unit (de. Nachrichtenbataillon 2) in Waldsieversdorf (Rotes Luch).

After interim steps in 1960 this battalion was expanded to become the Signal Regiment 19 (NR-19), a regiment-sized unit. In 1967 the name of honour Harro Schulze-Boysen was dedicated to this particular signal regiment. Subsequent to restructuring in 1970 the unit received finally the designation Nachrichtenregiment 14 (NR-14), Harro Schulze-Boysen.

Organization 
The NR-14 was direct supported to the NVA Air Force Command (Kdo LSK/LV) with the organization structure as follows:

Signal battalion HQ Kdo LSK/LV (stationary) 
 Signal Operation’s Office / COMMCEN Strausberg (Eggersdorf), alternative COMMCEN-22
 Radio Relay Axis (RVG-961, stationary) with 10 radio relay sites (in bunkers)
 Radio Transmitter Center (stationary) with 4 RX sites
 COMMCEN Ranzig / Beeskow, alternative COMMCEN-23
 Signal battalion MOC Kdo LSK/LV (stationary) 
 COMMCEN Fürstenwalde Bunker Fuchsbau, Alternative COMMCEN-21
 Transmission Center Fürstenwalde 2
 Two radio companies, key telegraph, RX center (HF)
 Training battalion communications and Air Traffic Control 
 Two training companies
 Radio battalion (deployable) with TX stations HF long distance (stationary) 
Telephone, teleprinter, switchboard, carrier frequency telephone/voice frequency telegraphy
 HF, Aeronautical mobile service
 Radio relay stations (deployable, up to 24 standard telephone channels)
 Field cable laying equipment (cable: LFL, FFK 36/250, FVK 60)
 Special equipment: Battle command center (de: GFZ)
 TX site HF (partial stationary) TX Center-2
 Repair and maintenance company

Organization after disbandment of the NVA
With the disbandment of the NVA in 1990 the stationary HF transmitter site (Limsdorf) was long-lasting integrated into the organization structure of the German Air Force (GAF). Also some handheld equipment and the so-called aeronautical radio equipment east were integrated to the equipment pool Deployable Air Situation Display and Interface Processor System  (DASDIPS).

After that the NR-14,  meanwhile Fernmeldeabteilung 14 (FmAbt-14), was disbanded April 1, 1993. The Bundswehr site Waldsieversdorf (Rotes Luch) was given up as well.

The in-service support management for DASDIPS equipment, in operation at present, is with GAF Weapon Systems Command. The operational responsibility to DASDIPS is with the German Air Force Command.

References

Sources 
 Präzisierung Bildung NR-19 aus NB-2 und NB-12 anhand Dok. im Militärarchiv Freiburg
 Auszug Direktive 1/85 als Kopie aus der VS-Stelle/ Registratur A2 Kdo 5. Luftwaffendivision Herbst 1991
 Org-Befehl 11/1990 ff. des Kommandeur Kdo LSK/LV Vorbereitungsstab 5. LwDiv
 Chronik der 5. Luftwaffendivision- Verfasser Major i.G. Gäbelein

Literature 
Wilfried Kopenhagen: Die Luftstreitkräfte der NVA, Motorbuch, Stuttgart, 2002,

External links 

 NR-14 auf DDR-Luftwaffe.de
 Protokoll der 41. Sitzung des NVR vom 14. Juli 1972
 Protokoll der 55. Sitzung des NVR vom 16. Juni 1978
 Weblink 5. Luftwaffendivision (LwDiv)
 http://www.DDR-LUFTWAFFE.de/

1956 establishments in East Germany
Military units and formations established in 1956
Regiments of the Luftstreitkräfte
1993 disestablishments in Germany
Military units and formations disestablished in 1993